This is a list of Members of Parliament (MPs) elected in the 1886 general election, held over several days from 1 July to 27 July 1886.



By-elections

June 1887: County Carlow – James Patrick Mahon (Irish Liberal) succeeding John Aloysius Blake (Irish Parliamentary Party) who died 22 May 1887
 21 September 1887: Kerry South – Denis Kilbride (Irish Parliamentary Party) succeeding John O'Connor (Irish Parliamentary Party) who had resigned
15 May 1890: Mid-Tipperary – Henry Harrison (Irish Parliamentary Party) succeeding Thomas Mayne (Irish Parliamentary Party) who had resigned
30 May 1890: West Donegal – J. J. Dalton
26 August 1891: 1891 Lewisham by-election - John Penn (Conservative Party) succeeding Viscount Lewisham (Conservative Party) who had inherited his father's seat in the House of Lords.
6 November 1891: Cork City – Martin Flavin (Irish National Federation – Anti-Parnellite) succeeding Charles Stewart Parnell (Irish National League – Parnellite) who died 6 October.

Sources

See also
UK general election, 1886
List of parliaments of the United Kingdom

1886
 List
UK MPs
1886 United Kingdom general election